Pyae Phyo Zaw (born 2 June 1994 in Myanmar) is a footballer from Burma, and a defender of Yangon United. He promoted from Yangon Youth Team to Yangon United Senior Team. Pyae Phyo Zaw was born in Taungoo, Bago Division.

Club career

Yangon United
First ever match of Pyae Phyo Zaw in Yangon United was against Hantharwady United. He was chosen when Zaw Min Tun was injured.

References

1994 births
Living people
People from Yangon Region
Burmese footballers
Association football defenders
Yangon United F.C. players
Myanmar international footballers